Stuart Shaw (born 19 November 1977 in Canberra) is an Australian cyclist, who most recently rode for UCI Continental team .

Major results

2005
 1st Stage 2 Tour of Gippsland
 1st Stage 2 Tour of Tasmania
 1st Stage 7 Tour of the Murray River
 2nd Overall Tour de Korea
2006
 1st Stage 2 Tour of Wellington
 Tour de Korea
1st Stages 1 & 5
 3rd Overall Canberra Tour
2007
 1st Overall National Road Series
 1st  Overall Tour de Perth
1st Stage 2a
 1st Stage 4 Canberra Tour
2008
 3rd Halle–Ingooigem
 7th Overall Tour de Okinawa
2009
 1st Stage 1 Tour de Gironde
 2nd Overall Canberra Tour
1st Stage 2
2010
 1st Stage 7 Tour de Langkawi
 2nd Overall Tour of the Murray River
1st Stage 1
2011
 3rd National Criterium Championships
2016
 1st Stage 3 National Capital Tour

References

External links

1977 births
Living people
Australian male cyclists
Sportspeople from Canberra